The following is a comprehensive discography of ZZ Top, an American rock band. They have released 15 studio albums, four live albums, seven compilation albums and 44 singles.

Albums

Studio albums

Live albums

Compilation albums

Video albums

Box sets

EPs

Singles

As featured artist

Promo singles

Other charted songs

Other appearances

Notes

References

External links

Rock music group discographies
Blues discographies
Discography
Discographies of American artists